Louis A. Romano (born August 20, 1930) is an American Democratic Party politician who served four terms in the New Jersey General Assembly from 1992 to 2000, where he represented the 33rd Legislative District.

Early life
Romano earned his undergraduate degree from Fordham University, with a major in Social Studies, earned a Master of Arts from Seton Hall University in Professional Education and was awarded a Doctor of Education from New York University. He served in the United States Army from 1951 to 1953, attaining the rank of corporal. A resident of West New York, Romano was employed by the West New York School District.

Assemblyman
Romano was first elected to the General Assembly in 1991, together with Bernard Kenny of Jersey City, defeating Republican candidates Antonio Miguelez and A. Lazaro Guas. Romano won re-election to the Assembly three times with Rudy Garcia of Union City as his running mate, soundly defeating Republicans Mary C. Gaspa and Armando C. Hernandez in 1993, Raphael S. Alvarez and Joseph Liuzzi in 1995, and Michael Alvarez and Freddy Gomez in 1997. He served in the Assembly on the Appropriations Committee and the Joint Budget Oversight Committee.

In the June 1999 primaries, the Hudson County Democratic Party organization was looking for "new blood" and chose to give its official support to West New York mayor Albio Sires, as well as Romano's fellow Assemblymember Rudy Garcia. Despite losing the endorsement, Romano ran in the Democratic primary and lost, making him the only one of the 80 incumbents in the Assembly to lose their primary bid.

References

1930 births
Living people
Fordham University alumni
Democratic Party members of the New Jersey General Assembly
Steinhardt School of Culture, Education, and Human Development alumni
Seton Hall University alumni
People from West New York, New Jersey
Politicians from Hudson County, New Jersey
United States Army soldiers